Dihydrogossypetin is a flavanonol, a type of flavonoid.

Biosynthesis
The enzyme Taxifolin 8-monooxygenase hydroxylates taxifolin using NADH, NADPH, H+, and O2 to produce 2,3-dihydrogossypetin, NAD+, NADP+, and H2O.

References

Flavanonols
Catechols
Hydroxyquinols